Baraita (Aramaic:  "external" or "outside"; pl. Barayata or Baraitot; also Baraitha, Beraita; Ashkenazi: Beraisa) designates a tradition in the Jewish oral law not incorporated in the Mishnah. Baraita thus refers to teachings "outside" of the six orders of the Mishnah. Originally, "Baraita" probably referred to teachings from schools outside the main Mishnaic-era academies – although in later collections, individual Baraitot are often authored by sages of the Mishna (Tannaim).

According to Maimonides (Introduction to Mishneh Torah), the baraitot were compiled by Rabbi Hoshaya and Bar Kappara, although no compilation was passed down to us as the Tosefta was.

Because the Mishnah encapsulates the entire Oral Law in a purposely compact form (designed to both facilitate and necessitate oral transmission), many variant versions, additional explanations, clarifications and rulings were not included in the Mishnah. These were later compiled in works called the "Baraitot" – often in the form of a list of teachings by one sage. Baraita can thus also designate collections of such traditions. The main collections of Baraita are the Tosefta and the Halakhic Midrashim (Mekhilta, Sifra and Sifre).

The authority of the Baraita is somewhat less than that of the Mishnah. Nevertheless, these works are the basic "proof-text" cross-referenced by the Talmudic sages in their analysis and interpretation of the Mishna; see Gemara. Here, a teaching from the Baraita is usually introduced by the Aramaic word "Tanya" ("It was orally taught") or by "Tanu Rabanan" ("Our Rabbis have orally taught"), whereas "Tnan" ("We have orally taught") introduces quotations from the Mishnah. Anonymous Baraitot are often attributed to particular Tannaim by the Talmud. In the Jerusalem Talmud, references to Baraitot are less common.

The style of the Baraita is basically indistinguishable from that of the Mishna, but some come closer to Mishnaic idiom than others. For example, the second chapter of Kallah Rabbathi, a beraita compilation, is often appended to Pirkei Avoth, as both are similar in style and content.

See also
 Gemara
 Midrash
 Talmud

References

 Baraita, jewishencyclopedia.com
 Maimonides Introduction to the Mishneh Torah (English translation)
 Tosefta and Baraita (Hebrew), Maimonides, Introduction to the Commentary on the Mishna
 The Oral Tradition by Aryeh Kaplan

External links
Brief General Introduction to the Babylonian Talmud

Tannaitic literature
Talmud
Aramaic words and phrases
Aramaic words and phrases in Jewish prayers and blessings